Johny Lal was an Indian cinematographer who worked predominantly in Bollywood and Kannada films. Lal's well-known films include Veerey Ki Wedding (2018), Partner (2007),  Kucch To Hai (2003), Rehnaa Hai Terre Dil Mein (2003) and Mujhe Kucch Kehna Hai (2001).

Lal won the 1993 Karnataka State Film Award for Best Cinematographer for Aathanka.

Career

After working in several films as an associate cameraman, Johny Lal worked as an independent cinematographer in several successful films like  Aathanka, Partner,  Kucch To Hai, Rehnaa Hai Terre Dil Mein, Mujhe Kucch Kehna Hai and Shaadi Se Pehle.

Personal life

Lal died due to COVID-19 related complications on 21 April 2021.

Awards
Karnataka State Film Awards
Best Cinematographer for Aathanka

References

External links
 

Indian cinematographers
People from Mumbai
2021 deaths
Kannada film cinematographers
Deaths from the COVID-19 pandemic in India